Old Timbers is a historic home located within Big Oaks National Wildlife Refuge (formerly Jefferson Proving Ground) in Shelby Township, Ripley County, Indiana.  It was built in 1932, and is a -story, Bungalow / American Craftsman style stone building. It has a jerkinhead roof and kitchen wing.  It was originally built as a lodge for Alexander Thompson, owner of the Champion Paper Company of Hamilton, Ohio.  The property was acquired by the U.S. Army in 1940.

It was added to the National Register of Historic Places in 1996.

References

Houses on the National Register of Historic Places in Indiana
Bungalow architecture in Indiana
Houses completed in 1932
Buildings and structures in Ripley County, Indiana
National Register of Historic Places in Ripley County, Indiana